The 2013–14 Biathlon World Cup – World Cup 9 event was held in Holmenkollen, Norway, from March 20 until March 23, 2014.

Schedule of events

Medal winners

Men

Women

Achievements
 Best performance for all time

 First World Cup race

References 

2013–14 Biathlon World Cup
2014 in Norwegian sport
International sports competitions in Oslo
March 2014 sports events in Europe
2010s in Oslo
2013-14 Biathlon World Cup